Elections to Southwark Council were held on 7 May 1998.  The whole council was up for election. Turnout was 32.9%.

Election result

|}

Ward results

Abbey

Linda Manchester was a sitting councillor for Riverside ward

Alleyn

Howard Latham was a sitting councillor for Bellenden ward

Barset

Bellenden

Bricklayers

Browning

Brunswick

Robert Wingfield was a sitting councillor for Newington ward

Burgess

Richard Livingstone was a sitting councillor for Chaucer ward

Cathedral

Michael Gibson was a sitting councillor for Waverley ward

Chaucer

Henry Canagasabey was a sitting councillor for Alleyn ward

Anne Worsley was a sitting councillor for Bellenden ward

College

Consort

Dockyard

Faraday

Friary

Frank Pemberton was a sitting councillor for Rotherhithe ward, and was previously elected as a Liberal Democrat councillor

Liddle

William Skelly was a sitting councillor for St Giles ward

Danny McCarthy was previously elected as a Labour councillor

Lyndhurst

Newington

Riverside

Rotherhithe

Niko Barr was a sitting councillor for Dockyard ward

Ruskin

Rye

St Giles

Stephanie Elsy was a sitting councillor for Barset ward

The Lane

Aubyn Graham was a sitting councillor for Lyndhurst ward

Waverley

By-Elections

The by-election was called following the resignation of Cllr. Nicola A. Kutapan.

The by-election was called following the death of Cllr. Victor D. Jones.

The by-election was called following the resignation of Cllr. Clifford J. Hodson.

References

Council elections in the London Borough of Southwark
1998 London Borough council elections
20th century in the London Borough of Southwark